Emily Defroand  (born 27 July 1994) is an English field hockey player who plays as a midfielder for Surbiton.

On 15 June 2021 her retirement from playing for the England and Great Britain national teams was announced.

She grew up in Hornchurch, Essex with her two brothers James and Alexander and whilst still at school started playing hockey for Havering.

Club career
She plays club hockey in the Women's England Hockey League Premier Division for Surbiton.

Defroand previously played for University of Birmingham.

References

External links
Profile on England Hockey
Profile on Great Britain Hockey

1994 births
Living people
English female field hockey players
Commonwealth Games medallists in field hockey
Commonwealth Games bronze medallists for England
Surbiton Hockey Club players
Women's England Hockey League players
University of Birmingham Hockey Club players
Field hockey players at the 2018 Commonwealth Games
Medallists at the 2018 Commonwealth Games